One Night is a 2005 Iranian film. It was the directorial debut of Niki Karimi.

The movie was screened in the Un Certain Regard section of the 2005 Cannes Film Festival.

Plot
Negar (Hāni'eh Tavassoli) has been kicked out of home by her mother. She is left with no choice but to spend the night walking around the streets of Tehran where she meets three men who all have different stories.

Festivals
One Night was screened at the following festivals:
Cannes film festival 2005
Munich Film Festival
Osian's Connoisseur
Toronto Film Festival
Edition du Festival du film
Sienna Film Festival
Reykjavik International Film Festival 2005
Brisbane International Film Festival 2006
Vancouver Film Festival
Gangnam Tyme Park Festival
Kolkata International Film Festival, India 2014

References

External links
Cannes movie profile
 

2005 films
2000s Persian-language films
2005 drama films
Films directed by Niki Karimi
2005 directorial debut films
Iranian drama films